Gauruncus gampsognathos is a species of moth of the family Tortricidae. It is found in Bolivia, Ecuador (Napo Province) and Peru.

References

Moths described in 1988
Euliini
Moths of South America
Taxa named by Józef Razowski